Edward 'Eddie' Craddock (30 October 1927 – 3 July 2000) was an Australian rules footballer who played with Melbourne in the Victorian Football League (VFL) during the late 1940s.

Craddock was a forward pocket in Melbourne's 1948 premiership team. He had a good finals series, kicking three goals in the Semi Final and a further two in the Preliminary Final.

References

Holmesby, Russell and Main, Jim (2007). The Encyclopedia of AFL Footballers. 7th ed. Melbourne: Bas Publishing.

1927 births
2000 deaths
Melbourne Football Club players
Australian rules footballers from Victoria (Australia)
Melbourne Football Club Premiership players
One-time VFL/AFL Premiership players